Son Ho-jun (born June 27, 1984) is a South Korean actor and singer.

Early years and career
Son Ho-jun made his acting debut in 2006 in the educational drama, Jump 2. In 2007, Son made his entertainment debut as the leader of Tachyon, a three-member boyband, which first performed on the show A-Live on Channel V Korea. The first pop group launched by J&H Media, Tachyon released the debut single Feel Your Breeze (a Korean remake from the Japanese boyband V6), then disbanded shortly after.

After appearing in the SBS drama Coffee House, which ended in July 2010, Son entered military service. Upon his return in 2013, he returned to acting and rose to stardom for playing the character Haitai in campus drama Reply 1994. He also gained popularity for appearing in reality shows, notably Youth Over Flowers and Three Meals a Day: Fishing Village.

In July 2016, Son signed with YG Entertainment. In 2017, he starred in the hit romance drama Confession Couple. In 2019, he gained critical acclaim for his acting in The Light in Your Eyes. In 2020, Son played the role of a successful novelist and scriptwriter in the Netflix drama, Was It Love?.

Philanthropy 
On December 6, 2022, Son participated in Naver Happy Bean's fundraiser with branded '119REO' firefighting suits to help improve the treatment of firefighters.

Filmography

Film

Television series

Web series

Television show

Web shows

Music video

Theater

Discography

Singles

Awards and nominations

References

External links 

1984 births
Living people
MBK Entertainment artists
South Korean male film actors
South Korean male television actors
Male actors from Seoul
People from Gwangju